The North Fork Rancheria of Mono Indians of California is a federally recognized tribe of Mono Native Americans. North Fork Rancheria is the name of the tribe's reservation, which is located in Madera County, California. Nim is their self-designation.

Culture
The North Fork Mono tribe are Western Mono Indians, whose traditional homeland is in the southern Sierra Nevada foothills of California. The Mono language is part of the Uto-Aztecan language family. Their oral history is included in Mono traditional narratives.

Enrollment
The tribe's 1996 Constitution allows open enrollment to eligible lineal descendants of the Northfork Mono. Their enrollment is 1800, making them one of California's largest native tribes.

Reservation
Their tribal headquarters are located in North Fork of Madera County, California.

Mono tribes
Other federally recognized Mono tribes are the Tule River Indian Tribe of the Tule River Reservation, Cold Springs Rancheria of Mono Indians of California, and the Big Sandy Rancheria of Mono Indians of California.

Education
The ranchería is served by the Chawanakee Joint Elementary School District and Minarets Joint Union High School District.

Notes

References
 Pritzker, Barry M. A Native American Encyclopedia: History, Culture, and Peoples. Oxford: Oxford University Press, 2000.

External links
 North Fork Rancheria of Mono Indians, official website
 History and Timelines of the North Fork Rancheria of Mono Indians
 Book: Walking Where We Lived: Memoirs of a Mono Indian Family by Gaylen D. Lee

Mono tribe
Native American tribes in California
Federally recognized tribes in the United States